The Civilian Disobedience Medal was a war service medal of the Kingdom of Belgium established by royal decree on 12 February 1951 and awarded to Belgian citizens refusing to support the German war effort during the Second World War.

Award description
The Civilian Disobedience Medal was a circular 37mm in diameter bronze medal.  Its obverse bore the relief torso of a civilian male with his arms crossed and his face turned away to the right in defiance.  The reverse bore the relief inscription on two lines in Latin "FORSAN VICTI NUNQUAM SERVI" roughly translating into "MAYBE DEFEATED BUT NEVER SLAVES".  The years "1940-1945" are inscribed along the reverse's upper circumference. 

The medal was suspended by a ring through a suspension loop to a 38mm wide silk moiré green ribbon with two 3mm wide longitudinal stripes located 1cm from the edges, the stripes came in three different colours depending on the reason for bestowal:
 yellow stripes indicated refusal to serve in the German armed forces;
 white stripes indicated refusal to work for the Germans;
 red stripes indicated refusal to return to Germany by a forced labourer following leave at home in Belgium.

References
Royal Decree of 12 February 1951 creating the Médaille du Réfractaire

Other sources
 Quinot H., 1950, Recueil illustré des décorations belges et congolaises, 4e Edition. (Hasselt)
 Cornet R., 1982, Recueil des dispositions légales et réglementaires régissant les ordres nationaux belges. 2e Ed. N.pl.,  (Brussels)
 Borné A.C., 1985, Distinctions honorifiques de la Belgique, 1830-1985 (Brussels)

See also
 List of Orders, Decorations and Medals of the Kingdom of Belgium

External links
Bibliothèque royale de Belgique (In French)
Les Ordres Nationaux Belges (In French)

Orders, decorations, and medals of Belgium
Awards established in 1951
1951 establishments in Belgium